Dalmasa is a Buddhist temple of the Jogye Order in Seoul, South Korea. It is located in 61-34 Heukseok 1-dong in the Dongjak-gu area of the city.

History
The temple was founded in 1931.In 1998 the temple fgot recognition for its historical importance for its history and modernization of korean buddhism.

See also
List of Buddhist temples in Seoul

References

External links
koreatemple.net

Buddhist temples in Seoul
Dongjak District
Buddhist temples of the Jogye Order